Fuzzy's Taco Shop is an American fast casual restaurant chain specializing in Baja-style Mexican cuisine. Serving breakfast, lunch and dinner, Fuzzy's operates more than 150 locations in 17 states.

History
In 2001, Paul Willis opened the first Fuzzy's Taco Shop on West Berry Street in Fort Worth, Texas, near the campus of Texas Christian University. It was purchased in 2003 by Chuck and Alan Bush, who opened the brand's second restaurant in East Fort Worth in 2007 before launching a rapid expansion of the chain through franchising that focused primarily on locations near college campuses before branching out into other areas.

The brand opened its 50th location in 2012 and its 100th location in 2016 - just months after selling a 70% stake to Atlanta-based private equity group NRD Capital Management.

Fuzzy's surpassed 150 locations in early 2019, and now operates restaurants in Texas, Oklahoma, Louisiana, Arkansas, Arizona, Colorado, Florida, Georgia, Iowa, Kansas, Mississippi, Missouri, Montana, Nebraska, South Carolina, Ohio and Virginia. The company has announced plans to surpass 200 locations by 2021. In January 2022, Fuzzy's announced an agreement to expand into Alabama and North Carolina. In December 2022, the chain was acquired by Dine Brands Global.

References

External links 
Official Website

Companies based in Fort Worth, Texas
Economy of the Southwestern United States
Regional restaurant chains in the United States
Fast-food chains of the United States
Fast-food Mexican restaurants
Restaurants established in 2001
2001 establishments in Texas
2022 mergers and acquisitions